Paul Grischok (born February 26, 1986, in Kędzierzyn-Koźle) is a Polish-German footballer who plays for Berliner AK.

Career

Club
In August 2010, he joined Polish club Widzew Łódź. 
Following stints with further clubs in Poland, Bulgaria and with Stuttgarter Kickers he joined BFC in February 2014. Coming on as a substitute he scored his first goal for the wine-reds in a match against the Under 23 team of FC Hansa Rostock on 23 March 2014.

References

External links
 
 

1986 births
Polish footballers
German footballers
German people of Polish descent
Servette FC players
Widzew Łódź players
Olimpia Grudziądz players
FC Etar 1924 Veliko Tarnovo players
Bayer 04 Leverkusen players
Stuttgarter Kickers players
Berliner FC Dynamo players
Berliner AK 07 players
Ekstraklasa players
First Professional Football League (Bulgaria) players
Expatriate footballers in Switzerland
Expatriate footballers in Bulgaria
Expatriate footballers in Poland
Living people
People from Kędzierzyn-Koźle
Sportspeople from Opole Voivodeship
3. Liga players
Association football midfielders